Nupserha grisea is a species of beetle in the family Cerambycidae. It was described by Per Olof Christopher Aurivillius in 1914.

Varietas
 Nupserha grisea var. rufobasiantennata Breuning, 1958
 Nupserha grisea var. basivittata Breuning, 1953
 Nupserha grisea var. subgrisea Breuning, 1953

References

grisea
Beetles described in 1914